Jesus "Bobo" Wilson (born January 25, 1995) is an American football wide receiver who is a free agent. He played college football at Florida State, and was signed by the Tampa Bay Buccaneers as an undrafted free agent in 2017.

Professional career

Tampa Bay Buccaneers
Wilson signed with the Tampa Bay Buccaneers as an undrafted free agent on May 1, 2017. He was waived on September 2, 2017 and was signed to the Buccaneers' practice squad the next day. He was promoted to the active roster on November 29, 2017.

On September 1, 2018, Wilson was waived by the Buccaneers and was re-signed to the practice squad.

On October 15, 2019, Wilson was waived by the Buccaneers.

Carolina Panthers
On December 11, 2019, Wilson was signed to the Panthers practice squad. His squad contract with the team expired on January 6, 2020.

Orlando Guardians
Wilson was assigned to the Orlando Guardians of the XFL on January 6, 2023.

References

External links
Tampa Bay Buccaneers bio

1995 births
Living people
Players of American football from Miami
Christopher Columbus High School (Miami-Dade County, Florida) alumni
American football wide receivers
Florida State Seminoles football players
Tampa Bay Buccaneers players
Carolina Panthers players
Orlando Guardians players